Warshaw is a surname. Notable people with the surname include:

Bobby Warshaw (born 1988), American soccer player
Dalit Warshaw (born 1974), American composer and pianist
Howard Scott Warshaw (born 1957), American psychotherapist and game designer
Jack Warshaw (born 1942), American folksinger
Matt Warshaw (born 1960), American surfer
Robert Warshaw, American law enforcement official